Rafael Carpio (born 26 October 1937) is a Mexican former sports shooter. He competed in the 25 metre pistol event at the 1968 Summer Olympics.

References

1937 births
Living people
Mexican male sport shooters
Olympic shooters of Mexico
Shooters at the 1968 Summer Olympics
Sportspeople from Mexico City